Chinese Puzzle is a 2013 French comedy-drama film written and directed by Cédric Klapisch. It is the third chapter of the Spanish Apartment trilogy, after L'Auberge Espagnole (2002) and Les Poupées russes (Russian Dolls, 2005).

Plot
Ten years have passed, and the once happy lovers, Xavier Rousseau (Romain Duris) and Wendy (Kelly Reilly), have split. When she moves with their two children to New York City, he also moves there to be near the children. Wendy now lives with John (Peter Hermann) in a luxury apartment overlooking Central Park. Xavier initially stays with Isabelle (Cécile de France) and Ju (Sandrine Holt), a lesbian couple whose child he fathered, but he soon finds his own apartment above a Chinese bakery where he works on a new novel assisted by brief visions of Arthur Schopenhauer and Georg Wilhelm Friedrich Hegel.

Having no work visa, Xavier is advised by his lawyer (Jason Kravits) to seek illegal employment and marry for a green card. After saving his taxicab driver from a vicious beating, the driver's grateful Chinese-American family agrees to have Xavier marry one of their relations, Nancy (Li Jun Li), who is amenable and complicit.

His former French girlfriend, Martine (Audrey Tautou), visits him while on a business trip and returns a second time with her own two children on spring break. Xavier and Martine briefly attempt to rekindle their relationship.

The film climaxes when the Immigration and Naturalization Service performs a surprise inspection of Xavier's apartment while Isabelle is using it to cheat on Ju with their babysitter (Flore Bonaventura). Later as Martine is departing for home with her kids, Xavier races on foot to catch her shuttle bus, confess his love, and ask her to stay and live with him. She agrees.

The film concludes with the cast of characters walking in a celebratory parade down a Chinatown street.

Cast
 Romain Duris as Xavier Rousseau
 Kelly Reilly as Wendy
 Audrey Tautou as Martine
 Cécile de France as Isabelle
 Sandrine Holt as Ju
 Flore Bonaventura as Isabelle the babysitter 
 Jochen Hägele as Hegel 
 Benoît Jacquot as Xavier's father 
 Martine Demaret as Xavier's mother
 Dominique Besnehard as the editor
 Zinedine Soualem as Mr. Boubaker
 Peter Hermann as John
 Jason Kravits as Xavier's lawyer
 Vanessa Guide as the nurse
 Kyan Khojandi as Antoine Garceau 
 Li Jun Li as Nancy
 Pablo Mugnier-Jacob as Tom
 Margaux Mansart as Mia
 Adrian Martinez as Le patron coursier
 Peter McRobbie as L'agent bureau immigration
 Larry Fessenden as Le premier rocker

Reception and awards 
The film garnered favourable reviews. It scored a 78% 'certified fresh' rating on review aggregation website Rotten Tomatoes, based on 64 reviews, with a weighted average of 6.52/10. The site's consensus states: "Pleasantly easygoing and consistently funny, Chinese Puzzle offers a suitably endearing conclusion to Cédric Klapisch's Trilogy of Xavier". At Metacritic, it has a score of 64 which is based on 24 critics, indicating "Generally favorable reviews". The film was nominated for the Best Music award at the 39th César Awards, and came second for the Audience Award for Best Narrative Feature at the 57th San Francisco International Film Festival.

References

External links 
 
 
 Chinese Puzzle at Rotten Tomatoes
 Chinese Puzzle at Metacritic
 Official US trailer (Cohen Media Group)
 Official US site (Cohen Media Group)

2013 films
2013 romantic comedy-drama films
Films directed by Cédric Klapisch
Films set in New York City
French romantic comedy-drama films
2010s French-language films
Lesbian-related films
2013 comedy films
2013 drama films
2010s English-language films
2013 multilingual films
French multilingual films
2010s French films
Foreign films set in the United States